Ben Sharrock is a Scottish film director and writer. He is best known for his work on the films Pikadero and Limbo. He has been nominated for two BAFTA Film Awards.

Career
Ben graduated from the University of Edinburgh with a degree in Arabic and Politics, and holds an MA in Film Directing and an MFA in Advanced Film Practice from Screen Academy Scotland, for which he received the Rafford Scholarship and University Medal for Outstanding Achievement. He was inducted into Edinburgh Napier University’s Hall of Fame in 2022. In 2015, he wrote and directed his debut feature, Pikadero, which premiered at the San Sebastian Film Festival.

In 2020, Ben wrote and directed his second feature film, Limbo, which premiered at the 73rd annual Cannes Film Festival.

Filmography

Awards and nominations

References

External links
 
 

Living people
Scottish film directors
Scottish film producers
Scottish screenwriters
Year of birth missing (living people)
Alumni of the University of Edinburgh